The 1997 St. Louis mayoral election was held on April 1, 1997 to elect the mayor of St. Louis, Missouri. It saw the election of Clarence Harmon and the defeat of incumbent mayor Freeman Bosley Jr. in the Democratic primary.

The election was preceded by party primaries on March 4.

Democratic primary

General election

References

Mayoral elections in St. Louis
St. Louis
1997 in Missouri